Svaika is a throwing game that was a favorite of Russian lower-class men up to the 20th century. It is a game in which a marlinspike-like spear is thrown to land in the middle of a metal ring lying on the ground some distance away. A tool for the game can weigh up to five pounds.

By one version, Tsarevich Dmitry died from a stab wound  while he was playing this game.

References

Throwing games
Russian games